James Ambrose Gallivan (October 22, 1866 – April 3, 1928) was a United States representative from Massachusetts.

Biography
Gallivan was born in Boston on October 22, 1866. He attended the public schools, graduated from the Boston Latin School in 1884 and from Harvard College in 1888. He then engaged in newspaper work.

Gallivan was a member of the Massachusetts House of Representatives in 1895 and 1896, and served in the Massachusetts State Senate from 1897 to 1898.  Gallivan served as street commissioner of Boston, and was elected as a Democrat to the Sixty-third Congress to fill the vacancy caused by the resignation of James Michael Curley. Andrew Peters later defeated Gallivan and two other candidates in the December 1917 election for Mayor of Boston.

Gallivan was reelected to the Sixty-fourth and to the six succeeding Congresses and served from April 7, 1914, until his death in Arlington on April 3, 1928.  His interment was in St. Joseph Cemetery in West Roxbury.

See also
 119th Massachusetts General Court (1898)
List of United States Congress members who died in office (1900–49)

References

External links

Footnotes

1866 births
1928 deaths
Democratic Party members of the Massachusetts House of Representatives
Democratic Party Massachusetts state senators
Politicians from Boston
Harvard University alumni
Boston Latin School alumni
Democratic Party members of the United States House of Representatives from Massachusetts